Giovanni Bersani (22 July 1914 – 24 December 2014) was an Italian politician. He was born and died in Bologna.

Bersani was a Christian Democratic deputy for six legislatures and senator in his seventh.

He was a member of the European Parliament between 1960 and 1989 and the undersecretary for the minister of Labour and Social Welfare in 1952–53, in the De Gasperi cabinet.

Honour 
 Knight Grand Cross of the Order of Merit of the Italian Republic (30 June 1994)

References

1914 births
2014 deaths
Politicians from Bologna
Christian Democracy (Italy) politicians
Deputies of Legislature I of Italy
Deputies of Legislature II of Italy
Deputies of Legislature III of Italy
Deputies of Legislature IV of Italy
Deputies of Legislature V of Italy
Deputies of Legislature VI of Italy
Senators of Legislature VII of Italy
Christian Democracy (Italy) MEPs
MEPs for Italy 1958–1979
MEPs for Italy 1979–1984
MEPs for Italy 1984–1989
Italian centenarians
Men centenarians
Knights Grand Cross of the Order of Merit of the Italian Republic